Spardorf is a small town in the district of Erlangen-Höchstadt, in Bavaria, Germany.

Mayor 
The mayor of Spardorf is Andreas Wasielewski (SPD), elected in March 2020.

Recent Projects 
The long-term project of the so-called 'Alte Ziegelei' (Old Brickyard) has been finalised in 2018, and the first store opened on the 25 October 2018. This commercial area can provide many people within a large radius, preventing them from having to travel longer distances and making it very convenient.

References

Erlangen-Höchstadt